Intensity! is the second studio album released by Croatian surf rock band The Bambi Molesters. The album was recorded in December 1998 and was released in 1999.

Background
In 1999, the band signed to Dancing Bear Records. The release of the album on the label prompted the band to tour all of Europe, alongside acts such as Man or Astro-man?, The Flaming Sideburns, and The Cramps. As their reputation for live shows expanded, radio stations in America and the United Kingdom began playing their music, exposing them to a wider audience. They also released music videos of "The Wedge" and "Bikini Machines" to promote the album.

In 1999, they performed as an opening act for R.E.M. during their European promotional tour for the album Up. R.E.M. guitarist Peter Buck, having gone to see the band play beforehand, was significantly impressed by the band's performance, and offered to perform on later albums. Buck appeared as a guest musician on the Bambi Molesters' 2001 album, Sonic Bullets: 13 from the Hip, where he contributed two guitar solos.

Track listing

Personnel
 Dalibor Pavičić – guitar
 Dinko Tomljanović – guitar
 Lada Furlan Zaborac – bass
 Hrvoje Zaborac – drums

Sources
 The Bambi Molesters official biography
 THE BAMBI MOLESTERS - INTENSITY! 

1999 albums
The Bambi Molesters albums